The Hobart Hurricanes are an Australian professional men's T20 franchise cricket team based in Hobart, Tasmania. They compete in Australia's domestic T20 cricket competition known as the Big Bash League. The Hurricanes play the majority of their home matches at Blundstone Arena in Hobart, with additional home matches at the University of Tasmania Stadium in Launceston. The Hurricanes wear a purple cricket uniform.

Some of the best players to represent the Hurricanes since their inception into the BBL have been: D'Arcy Short, Matthew Wade, Tim Paine, Ben McDermott, George Bailey, Dan Christian, Jofra Archer who was the X-factor in the Hurricanes team in BBL07, he bowled at a rapid pace, he was a genuine wicket-taker and had great accuracy regarding his variations. An aggressive lower-order batsman, Archer was a class above his teammates in the Hobart side. He played a crucial role in Hurricanes making the BBL07 final. Naved-ul-Hasan the Pakistani medium-pacer only played in BBL01, but he made a great impact in that season. His medium-pacers brought wickets in the middle and death overs, and he had an unplayable slower ball. Xavier Doherty, Riley Meredith, and Ben Hilfenhaus as a T20 bowler was very effective. Swinging the new ball, he’d give Hurricanes breakthroughs in the power play overs and nail his yorkers at the death. His BBL form for the Hurricanes saw him get an IPL gig with the Chennai Super Kings and a recall to the Australian T20 side in 2012.

History

Inaugural season

The Hobart Hurricanes' inaugural coach was Allister de Winter and their inaugural captain was Tim Paine.

The Hobart Hurricanes made a bright start to the inaugural Big Bash League season in 2011/12, winning their first game at the WACA Ground against the Perth Scorchers, making 140 before bowling out the Scorchers for 109, with the performance of fast bowler Ben Hilfenhaus resulting in his selection for the annual Boxing Day Test at the Melbourne Cricket Ground. In the Hurricanes' second match they faced fancied favorites Sydney Sixers before inflicting a 42-run defeat on the Sixers at Bellerive Oval in Hobart.
Rana Naved-ul-Hasan was the leading wicket taker in Big Bash League 2011–12, taking 15 wickets for the Hurricanes.

Other seasons
The Hurricanes played a total of 8 games in the 2012–13 Big Bash League. They ended up losing 4 and winning the same number of games. They finished the tournament in 6th position out of 8 teams. The Hurricanes qualified for the semi-finals in 2013–14 Big Bash by just 1 point ahead of Brisbane Heat. They won the semi-final against the Stars. They were outclassed by Perth Scorchers in the final by 39 runs. They finished as the runners-up, their best position so far. Ben Dunk was named the Man of the Tournament with 395 runs and Jonathan Wells was the young gun of the tournament. They only won 3 games in the 2014–15 season and ended up 5th on the table.

In July 2018, they were one of the six teams invited to play in the first edition of the Abu Dhabi T20 Trophy, scheduled to start in October 2018.

Year-by-year record

The BBL finals expanded to a top-five format in BBL09.

Sponsors

In BBL07, Tassal appeared as the chest sponsor for home games, while MyState appeared as the chest sponsor for away games.
The Hurricanes, along with a number of other BBL teams, introduced a sleeve sponsor for BBL08

Team song
The Hurricanes were the first BBL franchise to have their own team song, the lyrics of which were written by Tim Paine performed to the tune of When Johnny Comes Marching Home. The lyrics to the song (as of BBL06) are as follows:

The purple army's on the march again, again.
The purple army's on the march again, again.
We bat, we bowl, we take control,
We play the game with guts and soul
The purple army's on the march again.

The Hurricanes have won the game again, again.
The Hurricanes have won the game again, again.
We'll knock 'em down, we'll win the fight.
We'll sing our victory song tonight.
The Hurricanes have won the game again, again!

The song's original second verse, prior to BBL06, made reference to the now-defunct Champions League Twenty20:

The Hurricanes have won the game again, again.
The Hurricanes have won the game again, again.
The champion's league is in our sight,
We'll knock 'em down and win the fight.
The Hurricanes have won the game again, again!

The team also uses the song Rock You Like a Hurricane to lead the team onto the field, and Hurricane by Australian band Faker, the anthem for team mascot Captain Hurricane.

Records

Hobart holds a number of batting records in the Big Bash competition. As of January 2020, Hobart holds the second-highest team score in the competition's history with 8/223 against the Melbourne Renegades in January 2017, and the fifth-highest with 1/217 against the Adelaide Strikers in January 2020. On top of this, the team holds the four highest run chases in Big Bash history.

Matthew Wade’s unbeaten 130 off 61 balls against the Strikers in January 2020 is the second-highest individual score in competition history, and also overtaking teammate D'Arcy Short's for the highest Hurricanes score. Short’s unbeaten 122 off 69 balls against the Brisbane Heat in January 2018 was the highest individual score in BBL history until early 2020, while Ben McDermott's score of 114 against the Melbourne Renegades in January 2017 is the sixth-highest individual score in the competition's history.

In 2017–18, Short broke the competition record for the most individual runs in a season, scoring 465 runs in the first seven games of the season. The record broke Shaun Marsh's previous record of 412 runs in fewer games than Marsh's BBL02 record. In an extended season, Short scored 572 runs at 57.32, and was named player of the tournament.

Wade and Short hold the team record for the highest partnership, combining for 203 against the Strikers in the same game Wade set the Hurricanes individual score record. Short contributed 72 to the partnership before being dismissed.

In BBL11, Ben McDermott became the first player in competition history to hit back-to-back centuries, with an unbeaten 110 against the Adelaide Strikers and 127 against the Melbourne Renegades, and also became the first player to hit three centuries in the competition.

The competition's leading wicket-taker Ben Laughlin spent the first three seasons of the competition in Hurricanes' colours before moving to the Strikers. Former Hurricane Dan Christian’s figures of 5/14 against the Adelaide Strikers in BBL06 are the third-best bowling figures in competition history, while Short’s 5/21 against the Thunder in BBL09 are the fifth-best, with Short the only player in BBL history with a spot in the top five for highest batting score and best bowling figures.

Current squad
The current squad of the Hobart Hurricanes for the 2021–22 Big Bash League season as of 6 December 2022.
 Players with international caps are listed in bold.

Captains

Honours

Domestic
Big Bash:
Champions (0):
Runners-Up (2): 2013–14, 2017–18
Minor Premiers (1): 2018–19
Finals Series Appearances (5): 2011–12, 2013–14, 2017–18, 2018–19, 2019–20, 2021-22
Wooden Spoons (0):

International

CLT20:
Appearances (1): 2014 
Semi-Finals (1): 2014
Abu Dhabi T20 Trophy:
Appearances (1): 2018

See also

Cricket Tasmania
Tasmania cricket team

References

External links

Big Bash League teams
Cricket in Tasmania
Cricket clubs established in 2011
2011 establishments in Australia
Sport in Hobart